The tree pipit (Anthus trivialis) is a small passerine bird which breeds across most of Europe and the Palearctic as far East as the East Siberian Mountains. It is a long-distance migrant moving in winter to Africa and southern Asia. The scientific name is from Latin: anthus is the name for a small bird of grasslands, and the specific  trivialis means "common".

Taxonomy
The tree pipit was formally described by the Swedish naturalist Carl Linnaeus in 1758 in the tenth edition of his Systema Naturae under the binomial name Alauda trivialis. Linnaeus noted that the species occurred in Sweden. The specific epithet trivialis is Latin meaning "common" or "ordinary" from Latin trivium meaning "public street". The tree pipit is now placed in the genus Anthus that was introduced in 1805 by the German naturalist Johann Matthäus Bechstein.

Two subspecies are recognised:
 A. t. trivialis (Linnaeus, 1758) – breeds across Europe to southwest Siberia, north Iran and Turkey, east Kazakhstan, southcentral Siberia, Mongolia and northwest China; winters in India and Africa
 A. t. haringtoni Witherby, 1917 – breeds in northwest Himalayas; winters in central India

Description

This is a small pipit, which resembles meadow pipit. It is an undistinguished-looking species, streaked brown above and with black markings on a white belly and buff breast below. It can be distinguished from the slightly smaller meadow pipit by its heavier bill and greater contrast between its buff breast and white belly. Tree pipits more readily perch in trees.

The call is a strong spek, unlike the weak call of its relative. The song flight is unmistakable. The bird rises a short distance up from a tree, and then parachutes down on stiff wings, the song becoming more drawn out towards the end.

The breeding habitat is open woodland and scrub. The nest is on the ground, with 4–8 eggs being laid. This species is insectivorous, like its relatives, but will also take seeds.

Life cycle

mid-September to mid-April: lives in sub Saharan Africa
mid April to beginning of May: migrates and arrives in countries such as the United Kingdom
beginning of May to August: breeding season, two broods
August to mid September: flies back to Saharan Africas

Management and conservation

They breed in habitats with a wooded component, including Lowland heath and coppice.  They are found mostly in open birch woodland on the boundary with moorland, or open structured oak woodland – therefore heavy thinning is required to produce a gappy character.  They prefer low canopy medium-sized trees, where there is low-growing scrub and bramble less than 2 metres high, so that horizontal visibility is relatively high.  They like a mosaic of grass and bracken, but not very grazed short turf, so light to moderate grazing is preferred.  Glades are also valuable, and streams are preferred.

Once they have arrived they nest on the ground amongst grass or heather tussocks. They forage on invertebrates found in the ground vegetation.

They need scattered trees as song perches.

Grant funding for conservation

The Forestry Commission offers grants under a scheme called England's Woodland Improvement Grant (EWIG); as does  Natural Englands Environmental Stewardship Scheme.

Gallery

References

External links

Ageing and sexing (PDF; 1.7 MB) by Javier Blasco-Zumeta & Gerd-Michael Heinze
Feathers of Tree pipit (Anthus trivialis)

 Tree pipit - Species text in The Atlas of Southern African Birds.

tree pipit
Birds of Eurasia
Birds of Russia
Birds of Africa
Birds of South Asia
tree pipit
tree pipit
Articles containing video clips